The House of Știrbei, Știrbey or Stirbey is the name of an old Romanian noble family, whose members were once ruling Princes of Wallachia. The Princely Stirbey family was of Wallachian origin, first time documented in the 15th century, has marked the political and economical development of Romania, through many generations.

History 
The family emerged in the 19th century as collateral branch of the House of Bibescu. Prince Barbu Dimitrie Știrbei was the son of Boyar Dumitrache Bibescu, Palatine of Wallachia (1772–1831), and his wife, Ecaterina Văcărescu (1777–1842). He was adopted by his relation, one of the most prestigious Oltenian, Vornic Barbu C. Știrbei, the last of the Știrbey line of the family who left him heir to his wealth and also family name. Upon the adoption, this line of the Bibescu family became Princes Stirbey.

After the Revolution of 1848, in difficult times, Prince Barbu Stirbey (1799–1869) is elected Reigning Prince (“Domnitor”) of Wallachia, and seeks balanced relationships with the Ottoman Empire, the Austrian Empire and the Russian Empire, thus setting the foundations for an independent state. Under his rule (1849–1856), Wallachia went from a feudal and agriculture-based country to an enlightened nation, with its first industrial enterprises, a modern educational system and a well developed road network.

The House of Stirbei went extinct in the male line. Their heirs today are German Counts Wolff-Metternich zur Gracht.

Notable members 
Alexandru B. Știrbei (1837–1895), Finance Minister of Romania (1891)
Barbu Dimitrie Ştirbei (1796 or 1801–1869), Prince of Wallachia (1848–1853, 1854–1856)
Barbu Ştirbey (1873–1946), Prime Minister of Romania (1927)
Elisa (née Știrbei) Brătianu (1870-1957) politician and conservationist
George Barbu Ştirbei (1832–1925), Foreign Minister of Romania (1866–1867)

Properties

References

Romanian-language surnames